Varnek is a village on Vaygach Island of Zapolyarny District, Nenets Autonomous Okrug, Russia. It had a population of 101 as of 2010, an increase from its population of 94 in 2002.

Geography
Varnek is located on the southern coast of Vaygach Island.

History
In 1921, zinc-lead ores were found in the area, so a mine was established where prisoners of the Gulag worked. The settlement was established in the first half of the 1930s, named after Alexander Ivanovich Varnek, a Russian explorer of the Arctic. Varnek was the last village in Nenets Autonomous Okrug to be able to get phone calls, being introduced in 2011.

Climate
Varnek has a subarctic climate (Dfc).

References 

Rural localities in Nenets Autonomous Okrug